The Providence Shales is a geologic formation in Jamaica. It preserves fossils dating back to the Cretaceous period.

See also

 List of fossiliferous stratigraphic units in Jamaica

References

 

Cretaceous Jamaica
Shale formations
Geologic formations of the Caribbean